Cardistry-Con is an annual three-day cardistry convention and interactive conference for cardists all over the world. Organized by American sleight of hand pioneers Dan and Dave Buck for the first time in 2014 to promote the art form of cardistry, its schedule includes interviews, panel discussions, live performances, exclusive video screenings, workshops, contests and giveaways.

International
The first two conventions were held in the United States, but in recent years Cardistry-Con has been held in a different overseas location every second year.

The first to be held outside the United States was the 2016 convention, which took place in Berlin, Germany from July 8 to July 10.  The 2018 Cardistry-Con was held in Hong Kong.  The 2020 Cardistry-Con planned for Brussels, Belgium, was postponed in light of the coronavirus crisis.

See also
History of cardistry

References

External links
 Cardistry-Con on Facebook
 Cardistry-Con 2014 on YouTube
 Cardistry-Con 2015 on YouTube
 History of Cardistry documentary on YouTube

Festivals in San Diego
Recurring events established in 2014
2014 establishments in California
Culture of San Diego